The 1920 South Carolina gubernatorial election was held on November 2, 1920 to select the governor of the state of South Carolina. Governor Robert Archer Cooper faced no opposition in the Democratic primary nor the general election to win a second two-year term as governor.

Democratic primary
Governor Robert Archer Cooper faced no opposition from South Carolina Democrats and avoided a primary election.

General election
The general election was held on November 2, 1920 and Robert Archer Cooper was reelected governor of South Carolina without opposition. Turnout increased over the previous gubernatorial election because there was also a presidential election on the ballot.

 

|-
| 
| colspan=5 |Democratic hold
|-

See also
Governor of South Carolina
List of governors of South Carolina
South Carolina gubernatorial elections

References
"Report of the Secretary of State to the General Assembly of South Carolina.  Part II." Reports of State Officers Boards and Committees to the General Assembly of the State of South Carolina. Volume I. Columbia, South Carolina: 1921, p. 61.

External links
SCIway Biography of Robert Archer Cooper

Gubernatorial
1920
1920 United States gubernatorial elections
November 1920 events in the United States